HMAS Madang is a former Royal Australian Navy (RAN) base located at Madang in Papua New Guinea.

See also

List of former Royal Australian Navy bases

References

Closed facilities of the Royal Australian Navy